Tiefenbach may refer to:

Places

Austria
Tiefenbach bei Kaindorf, a former municipality in the district of Hartberg-Fürstenfeld in Styria, today part of Hartl
Tiefenbach, a township of the municipality of Judenburg in Styria

Czech Republic
Tiefenbach, a historical exonym for Hloubětín

Germany
Tiefenbach, Biberach, a municipality in Baden-Württemberg, in the district of Biberach
Tiefenbach, Landshut, a municipality in Bavaria, in the district of Landshut
Tiefenbach, Passau, a municipality in Bavaria, in the district of Passau
Tiefenbach, Rhineland-Palatinate, a municipality in the district of Rhein-Hunsrück
Tiefenbach, Saxony, a municipality in the district of Mittweida
Tiefenbach, Upper Palatinate, a municipality in Bavaria, in the district of Cham
Tiefenbach (Jagst), a river of Baden-Württemberg, tributary of the Jagst
Tiefenbach (Rems), a river of Baden-Württemberg, tributary of the Rems
Tiefenbach (Wisper), a river of Rhineland-Palatinate and Hesse, tributary of the Wisper
Tiefenbach (Oberstdorf), a quarter of Oberstdorf in Bavaria
Tiefenbach, a quarter of Crailsheim in Baden-Württemberg
Tiefenbach, a quarter of Illertissen in Bavaria

Poland

Switzerland
Tiefenbach, a former German name of Belprahon

Other uses
Tiefenbach DFB railway station, a station in Switzerland

People with the surname
Dov Tiefenbach (born 1981), Canadian actor and musician
Peter Tiefenbach, Canadian classical music composer and radio host, nominee in the Juno Awards of 1994
Rudolf von Tiefenbach (1582–1653), Habsburg military leader

See also
Oberweiler-Tiefenbach, an Ortsgemeinde in the Kusel district in Rhineland-Palatinate, Germany